Jumna was a  iron-hulled full-rigged ship that was built in England in 1867 and went missing in the Atlantic Ocean in 1899. For most of her career she was in the fleet of James Nourse.

Jumna was named after the Jamuna river, a tributary of the Ganges. This was the first of three ships in the Nourse Line fleet to be called Jumna. The second  was a steamship that was built in 1929 and sunk by a German cruiser in 1940. The third was a motor ship that was built in 1962, renamed in 1972 and scrapped in 1985.

Building and identification
William Pile of Sunderland built Jumna, launching her on 17 August 1867.

Jumnas UK official number was 56838 and she was registered in London. By 1884 her code letters were HTNS.

Voyages
Jumna carried indentured labourers from India to other British Empire territories, which was a Nourse Line speciality.

Details of some of these voyages are as follows:

The 310 labourers she carried to Fiji in 1893 was the smallest number of passengers carried by any ship transporting Indian indentured labourers to Fiji.

On 22 December 1893 Jumna transported 487 indentured labourers from the Volga (which had sunk) to Jamaica. In 1883 she repatriated 95 labourers back to India from Saint Lucia and another 137 in August 1892.

Fate
In 1898 NP Hoyer bought Jumna and registered her in Skien in Norway. On 21 February 1899 she left Greenock in Scotland laden with coal for Montevideo in Uruguay. She was last seen passing Rathlin Island in the North Channel. She was never seen again, and in due course was posted missing.

Notable passengers
 Totaram Sanadhya arrived in Fiji on 23 May 1893

See also
Indian Indenture Ships to Fiji
Indian indenture system

References

Bibliography

External links

1867 ships
Indian indentureship in Trinidad and Tobago
Indian indenture ships to Fiji
Individual sailing vessels
Sailing ships of the United Kingdom
Ships lost with all hands
Shipwrecks in the Atlantic Ocean
Victorian-era passenger ships of the United Kingdom